Cyrillic Extended-D is a Unicode block containing superscript and subscript Cyrillic characters used in Cyrillic-based phonetic transcription. The block contains the first Cyrillic characters defined outside of the Basic Multilingual Plane (BMP).

Block

History 
The following Unicode-related documents record the purpose and process of defining specific characters in the Cyrillic Extended-D block:

References 

Unicode blocks